Kemp Peninsula is an irregular ice-covered peninsula  long in a north–south direction and  wide.

The peninsula was first seen from the air in December 1940 by members of the U.S. Antarctic Service, who at that time photographed all but its northern extremity. During 1947 it was photographed from the air by the Ronne Antarctic Research Expedition, who in conjunction with the Falkland Islands Dependencies Survey (FIDS) charted it from the ground. It was named by the FIDS for Stanley W. Kemp, a British marine biologist and oceanographer, first Director of Research of the Discovery Investigations, 1924–36, and Director of the Plymouth Marine Laboratory, 1936–45.

References

Peninsulas of Palmer Land